Alessandro Andrade de Oliveira (born 27 May 1973), known as Alessandro Cambalhota, is a former Brazilian football player. He has played for the Brazil national team once.

Club statistics

National team statistics

Honours
Santos
Copa CONMEBOL: 1998

Porto
Taça de Portugal: 1999–2000
Supertaça Cândido de Oliveira: 1999

References

External links

1973 births
Living people
Brazilian footballers
Brazilian expatriate footballers
Campeonato Brasileiro Série A players
Primeira Liga players
Süper Lig players
J1 League players
CR Vasco da Gama players
Santos FC players
Fluminense FC players
Cruzeiro Esporte Clube players
Clube Atlético Mineiro players
Sport Club Corinthians Paulista players
Figueirense FC players
Esporte Clube Noroeste players
Clube Atlético Linense players
Júbilo Iwata players
Kayseri Erciyesspor footballers
Denizlispor footballers
FC Porto players
Al-Ahli Saudi FC players
Expatriate footballers in Japan
Expatriate footballers in Turkey
Expatriate footballers in Portugal
Association football forwards
Brazil international footballers